The Shepherd of the Hills is a 1964 American Western film directed by Ben Parker and starring Richard Arlen, James Middleton and Sherry Lynn. It is based on Harold Bell Wright's 1907 novel The Shepherd of the Hills. The story was filmed previously in the silent era by author Wright himself in 1919, released on State Rights basis. It was filmed again, in The Shepherd of the Hills (1928 film), starring Molly O'Day at First National Pictures. Again remade as 1941, also color version starring John Wayne.

Plot summary

Cast
 Richard Arlen as Old Matt 
 James Middleton as Daniel Howitt 
 Sherry Lynn as Sammy Lane 
 James Collie as Wash Gibbs 
 Lloyd Durre as Doc Coughlan 
 Hal Meadows as Young Matt 
 James Bradford as The Sheriff 
 Joy N. Houck Jr. as Ollie Stewart 
 Gilbert Elmore as Jess Lane 
 George Jackson as Jed Holland 
 Delores James as Aunt Mollie 
 Danny Spurlock as Pete 
 Reubin Egan as Howard 
 Tom Pope as Baldknobber 
 Roy Idom as Baldknobber 
 Jim Teague as Baldknobber 
 Roger Nash as Baldknobber 
 Jim Greene as Baldknobber 
 Jerry-Mac Johnston as Clint

References

Bibliography
 Rowan, Terry. The American Western A Complete Film Guide. 2013.

External links
 
 
 
 

1964 films
1964 Western (genre) films
1960s English-language films
1960s historical films
American historical films
American Western (genre) films
Films directed by Ben Parker
1960s American films